KDJS-FM (95.3 FM; "Hot Country K-95.3") is a radio station licensed to Willmar, Minnesota, United States.  The station is currently owned by Iowa City Broadcasting Company.

Programming
KDJS-FM, known on air as "Hot Country, K95.3", programs a country music radio format carrying "The American Country Countdown with Kix Brooks" as well as the Performance Racing Network's "Zmax Racing Country".

References

External links

Radio stations in Minnesota
Country radio stations in the United States
Radio stations established in 1971